DD Urdu is an Indian free-to-air television channel broadcasting from the Doordarshan Studios in Delhi. It broadcasts entertainment, cultural , news and infotainment programming in Urdu. Part of the Doordarshan TV Network, it serves Urdu communities in India.

TV series

References

Foreign television channels broadcasting in the United Kingdom
Television channels and stations established in 1992
Television stations in New Delhi
Direct broadcast satellite services
Indian direct broadcast satellite services
Urdu-language television channels in India
Doordarshan
Urdu-language television channels in the United Kingdom